Rockstar Vancouver Inc. (formerly Barking Dog Studios Ltd.) was a Canadian video game developer and a studio of Rockstar Games based in Vancouver. The studio is best known for developing Bully (2006).

Six former Radical Entertainment developers—Glenn Barnes, Peter Grant, Michael Gyori, Christopher Mair, Brian Thalken, and Sean Thompson—founded the company as Barking Dog Studios in May 1998. In its early years, Barking Dog briefly assisted Relic Entertainment with Homeworld (1999) before being greenlit to develop an expansion pack, Homeworld: Cataclysm (2000). The studio also developed Counter-Strikes "Beta 5" update (1999), Global Operations (2002), and Treasure Planet: Battle at Procyon (2002).

Take-Two Interactive acquired Barking Dog in August 2002 and it became part of Rockstar Games as Rockstar Vancouver. The studio then developed Bully and was one of the Rockstar Games studios leading the development of Max Payne 3 (2012). In July 2012, Rockstar Games merged Rockstar Vancouver into Rockstar Toronto, with Rockstar Vancouver's thirty-five employees being given the option to relocate to Rockstar Toronto or any other Rockstar Games studio.

History

Early years (1998–2002) 

Rockstar Vancouver was founded as Barking Dog Studios by Glenn Barnes, Peter Grant, Michael Gyori, Christopher Mair, Brian Thalken, and Sean Thompson. They had worked at developer Radical Entertainment until the company faced financial difficulties the late 1990s. As the studio's partnership with Disney had faltered, it lost its ESPN licence and was briefly in receivership. This prompted the formation of multiple companies by employees who left Radical Entertainment, including Black Box Games. The sextet established Barking Dog in May 1998. They sought a "non-corporate, non-pretentious" name during a brainstorming session and settled on one derived from the Barking Dog, a pub in California. The company formally began operating on 16 July 1998 after signing its first publishing contract.

The nascent studio worked with developer Relic Entertainment and publisher Sierra Studios on programming for the 1999 game Homeworld, and were shortly thereafter greenlit to develop an expansion pack, Homeworld: Cataclysm. During this time, Barking Dog moved into Relic's offices and had roughly twenty employees engaged in the game's development. Cataclysm was announced in February 2000 and released in September that year. When an updated version was released via the GOG.com platform in June 2017, its name was changed to Homeworld: Emergence because Blizzard Entertainment had since registered the "Cataclysm" trademark for World of Warcraft: Cataclysm.

Around 1999, Valve became interested in Counter-Strike, a mod co-created by Barking Dog employee Minh Le. As it became more deeply involved in the project, the company hired Barking Dog for the mod's "Beta 5" update. The studio developed roughly 90% of that update, which was released in December 1999. Le joined Valve shortly thereafter to continue Counter-Strikes development, and the finished game was released in November 2000. In the same month, Barking Dog was rumoured to be developing a tactical first-person shooter, which Crave Entertainment announced as Global Operations in December that year. Global Operations was released in March 2002, co-published by Crave Entertainment and Electronic Arts. Barking Dog began developing a proprietary game engine, ARES, in January 2001 and subsequently commenced production on a real-time strategy game using the engine that June. When the engine was unveiled in April 2002, the company expected to announce the game at that year's E3. The game, announced as Treasure Planet: Battle at Procyon, was developed in tandem with Treasure Planet, the Disney film it is based on. Disney's games division, Disney Interactive, released the game in November 2002 shortly before the movie.

Acquisition and Bully (2002–2007) 
As part of the purchase, Barking Dog became part of Take-Two's Rockstar Games label as Rockstar Vancouver. Rockstar Canada, Rockstar Games' studio in Oakville, Ontario, was renamed Rockstar Toronto to avoid confusion between the two. Jamie Leece, the president of Take-Two's Gotham Games label, assisted in the acquisition. At the time, the studio and its roughly 50 employees were working with Rockstar Games on two games: a military action game and an original title. In the time following the acquisition, several Rockstar Vancouver employees (including some of its founders) set up new studios, including Ironclad Games (founded in 2003), Kerberos Productions (2004), Slant Six Games (2005), Big Sandwich Games (2006), Hellbent Games (2006), and United Front Games (2007).

Under Rockstar Games, Rockstar Vancouver was working on Spec Ops, a reboot of the eponymous series. With music by Josh Homme and Alain Johannes of the band Queens of the Stone Age, the game was to be released in late 2005 but it was cancelled that year. Rockstar Vancouver's first released game was announced as Bully in May 2005. Before its release, the game's name and theme attracted some controversy from politicians, parents, and activists like Jack Thompson, who regarded it as advocating for school violence. In Europe, it was renamed Canis Canem Edit. Upon its release in 2006, the game garnered a positive critical response, and PC Gamers Sam Roberts labelled it Rockstar Games' "softest and silliest game, with the warmest heart" in a 2014 retrospective.

Max Payne 3 and closure (2008–2012) 
In October 2008, Rockstar Vancouver was rumoured to be developing a third instalment in the Max Payne series created by Remedy Entertainment. Rockstar Games announced the game as Max Payne 3 in March 2009, expecting to release it in late 2009. According to Dan Houser, the creative director, a new Max Payne game was chosen over a Bully sequel due to what he described as "limited bandwidth and limited studios, and more games to make than we've started". The development became a co-operation between Rockstar Vancouver, Rockstar Toronto, Rockstar London, and Rockstar New England. In a January 2010 open letter, the wives of several Rockstar San Diego employees claimed that their spouses had regularly worked overtime and that the studio was suffering from mismanagement. These claims were echoed by former employees of other Rockstar Games studios, including Rockstar Vancouver. The mismanagement was said to have caused Max Payne 3 missing its intended release window, being rescheduled for August–October 2010. The game was released in May 2012.

Two months later, on 9 July 2012, Rockstar Games announced that Rockstar Toronto would be moving into larger, custom-built offices in Oakville, into which Rockstar Vancouver would be merged. Rockstar Vancouver's thirty-five employees were given the option to relocate to the expanded Rockstar Toronto or any other Rockstar Games studio. Jennifer Kolbe, Rockstar Games' vice-president of publishing and operations, stated creating a single Canadian team that would "make for a powerful creative force on future projects", while making room for fifty new positions at Rockstar Toronto. Rockstar Vancouver's legal entity, Rockstar Vancouver Inc., remained formally registered under Canada's federal company laws. In November 2012, it was transitioned to a British Columbia corporation as Rockstar Games Vancouver Inc. and then transformed to Rockstar Games Vancouver ULC, an unlimited liability corporation. In August 2019, it was renamed Take-Two Interactive Software Vancouver ULC.

Games developed

As Barking Dog Studios

As Rockstar Vancouver

Cancelled 
 Spec Ops

References

External links 
  (archived)

1998 establishments in British Columbia
2002 mergers and acquisitions
2012 disestablishments in British Columbia
Canadian companies disestablished in 2012
Canadian companies established in 1998
Canadian subsidiaries of foreign companies
Companies based in Vancouver
Defunct companies of British Columbia
Defunct video game companies of Canada
Rockstar Games subsidiaries
Take-Two Interactive divisions and subsidiaries
Video game companies disestablished in 2012
Video game companies established in 1998
Video game development companies